St Ebbe's is a Church of England parish church in central Oxford. The church is within the conservative evangelical tradition and participates in the Anglican Reform movement. It has members from many nations, many of whom are students at Oxford University. The rector is Vaughan Roberts who is also an author and conference speaker.

History

The church stands on the site of one dedicated to St Æbbe before 1005. Most sources suggest that this was the Northumbrian St Æbbe of Coldingham, but it has been suggested that Æbbe of Oxford was a different saint. The name was first recorded in about 1005 when the church was granted to Eynsham Abbey by Ealdorman Æthelmær the Stout, when it was already recorded as the "ancient St Ebbe's".

The present church was built in 1814–16. It was restored between 1862 and 1868, and again in 1904. A Norman doorway of the 12th century has been restored and placed at the west end.  The church is the parish church for the parish of St Ebbes, a portion of which was demolished to make way for the nearby Westgate Shopping Centre in the 1970s. The church underwent further restoration in 2017 under the direction of Quinlan Terry. During this restoration some internal fittings were sold as architectural antiques. The organ was transferred to St Denys, York.

In 1957, the church of Holy Trinity, Blackfriars Road, was demolished having been deemed unsafe. This was merged into the present parish. In 1961, the parish of St Peter-le-Bailey merged with St Ebbe upon the foundation of St Peter's College (formerly St Peter's Hall) and its use of the church as its college chapel.

Present day
St Ebbe's continues to be highly active, with three meetings each Sunday at 9:45, 4:30 and 6:30, with the additional of a fourth 11:45 service during the university term. There are also a range of mid-week groups and youth work.

St Ebbe's is within the Conservative Evangelical tradition of the Church of England, and it has passed resolutions to reject the ordination of women and/or female leadership. It receives alternative episcopal oversight from the Bishop of Maidstone (currently Rod Thomas).

The church has a ministry among the remaining part of the parish, although most of its members live outside the parish. The church is a partner church of St Ebbe's Primary School, a school within the parish.

Ministers

Rectors 
 15??-1550: Thomas Dobson
 1550-1553: Ralph Rudde; Principal of St Edmund Hall
 1553-1576: Vacant
 1576-1585: John Paule
 1589-1593: William Singleton
 1593-1604: John Hilliard
 1604-1631: Jacob Yate
 1631-1641: Edward Wyrley
 1643-1648: Hugh Boham; Chaplain of All Souls College
 1664-1666: Richard Tapping
 1690-1691: Thomas Shewring
 1695-1696: Josias Dockwray
 1696-1697: Henry Hellier
 1697-1707: William Baker; later the Bishop of Norwich
 1707-1714: John Knott
 1714-1719: Matthew Panting; Master of Pembroke College
 1719-1727: Bernard Peisley
 1727-1734: Thomas Hillman
 1736-1742: Nathaniel Bliss; later the fourth Astronomer Royal
 1742-1753: Thomas Camplin; Vice-Principal of St Edmund Hall and later the Archdeacon of Taunton
 1753-1771: Robert Ewings
 1771-1809: Henry Richards
 1808-1868: William Hambury; later Chaplain to George IV
 1868-1874: E.P. Hathaway
 1874-1877: Thomas Valpy French, later Bishop of Lahore
 1881: John Arkell
 1901-1909: P.W.G. Filleul
 1912-1926: John Stansfeld
 1947–1952: Maurice Wood, later Principal of Oak Hill College and Bishop of Norwich
 1952–1964: Basil Gough
 1964–1985: Keith Weston
 1986–1998: David Fletcher
 1998–present: Vaughan Roberts

Curates 
 1816: John Penson
 1822-1824: William Wilson
 1825: Henry Bliss
 1826-1831: Henry Bulteel
 1831-1837: William Champneys
 1837-1842: H.B. Whitaker Churton
 1847-1860: G.T. Cameron
 1860-18??: S.Y.N. Griffith
 1934-1936: Pat Gilliat
 1950-1952: Edward Saunders
 1952-1956: Michael Farrer
 1955-1958: David Pytches, later Bishop of Chile, Bolivia and Peru
 1957-1960: Peter Dawes
 1958-1960: Brian Ringrose
 1960-1963: Patrick Harris
 1961-1964: James Spence
 1963-1966: Anthony Baker
 1964-1968: Gilbert Gauntlett
 1966-1972: Simon Starkey
 1968-1971: John Wesson
 1971-1974: Robert Hope
 1973-1976: Anthony Burdon
 1974-1976: Peter Toon
 1976-1980: Robert Key
 1980-1983: David Banting
 1983-1986: Kevin Scott
 1988-1991: Timothy Hastie-Smith, later Director of Scripture Union (England & Wales).
 1991-1998: Vaughan Roberts, later Rector
 1995-2001: David Gibb
 1999-2003: Anthony Jones
 2002–present: Pete Wilkinson
 2003-2008: Julian Bidgood
 2008-2012: Phil Jack
 2009–present: David Reid
 2010-2014: Suresh Menon
 2013-2018: James Fletcher
 2013-2017: Alistair Gibbs
 2017–2019: Matt Pope
 2017–2021: Joel Knight
 2021-present: Glenn Nesbitt

Non-stipendiary ministers 
 2005-2008: Sam Allberry
 2012-2013: Phil Jack
 2015–present: James Poole
 2016–present: John Miller

Deacons 
 1979-1991: Jean Ritchie
 1991-1993: Patricia Whelan

References

Further reading

1005 establishments in England
19th-century Church of England church buildings
Ebbe
Evangelicalism in the Church of England
Grade II* listed buildings in Oxford
Churches completed in 1816
Oxford
Oxford